Margaretha "Margreeth" de Boer (born 16 April 1939) is a retired Dutch politician of the Labour Party (PvdA).

Early life and education 
Margaretha de Boer was born on 16 April 1939 in Amsterdam in the Netherlands. She studied at the Social Academy.

Political career 
De Boer is a member of the Dutch Labour Party (PvdA). She was Queen's Commissioner of Drenthe (1993–1994), Minister of Housing, Spatial Planning and the Environment in the First Kok cabinet (1994–1998), Member of the House of Representatives (1998–2001), Mayor of Leeuwarden (2001–2004), and Mayor of Hoogeveen (2010–2011).

Decorations

References

External links

Official
  M. (Margreeth) de Boer Parlement & Politiek

 

1939 births
Living people
Dutch corporate directors
Dutch nonprofit directors
King's and Queen's Commissioners of Drenthe
Labour Party (Netherlands) politicians
Mayors in Drenthe
People from Hoogeveen
Mayors of Leeuwarden
Members of the House of Representatives (Netherlands)
Members of the Provincial Council of North Holland
Members of the Provincial-Executive of North Holland
Ministers of Housing and Spatial Planning of the Netherlands
Municipal councillors in North Holland
Officers of the Order of Orange-Nassau
Politicians from Amsterdam
Women government ministers of the Netherlands
Women mayors of places in the Netherlands
20th-century Dutch civil servants
20th-century Dutch politicians
21st-century Dutch politicians
Women King's and Queen's Commissioners of the Netherlands
20th-century Dutch women
20th-century Dutch people